Catherine Winkworth (13 September 1827 – 1 July 1878) was an English hymnwriter and educator. She translated the German chorale tradition of church hymns for English speakers, for which she is recognized in the calendar of the Evangelical Lutheran Church in America. She also worked for wider educational opportunities for girls, and translated biographies of two founders of religious sisterhoods. When 16, Winkworth appears to have coined a once well-known political pun, peccavi, "I have Sindh", relating to the British occupation of Sindh in colonial India.

Early life
Catherine Winkworth was born on 13 September 1827 at 20 Ely Place, Holborn on the edge of the City of London. She was the fourth daughter of Henry Winkworth, a silk merchant. In 1829, her family moved to Manchester, where her father had a silk mill and which city figured in the Industrial Revolution. Winkworth studied under the Rev. William Gaskell, minister of Cross Street Chapel, and with Dr. James Martineau, both of them eminent British Unitarians. Urban historian Harold L. Platt notes that in the Victorian period "The importance of membership in this Unitarian congregation cannot be overstated: as the fountainhead of Manchester Liberalism it exerted tremendous influence on the city and the nation for a generation."

She subsequently moved with the family to Clifton, near Bristol. Her sister Susanna Winkworth (1820–1884) was also a translator, mainly of German devotional works.

Chorale tradition
Catherine Winkworth spent a year in Dresden, during which time she took an interest in German hymnody. Around 1854, she published her book Lyra Germanica, a collection of German hymns which she had chosen and translated into English. A further collection followed in 1858. During 1863, she published The Chorale Book for England, which was coedited by the composers William Sterndale Bennett and Otto Goldschmidt. In 1869 she followed this with Christian Singers of Germany.

According to The Harvard University Hymn Book, Winkworth "did more than any other single individual to make the rich heritage of German hymnody available to the English-speaking world." Four examples of translations by her hand are published in The Church Hymn Book 1872 (Nos 344, 431, 664 and 807).

Among the best-known chorales translated by Winkworth are "From Heaven Above to Earth I Come" ("Vom Himmel hoch, da komm ich her", Martin Luther, 1534); "Wake, Awake, for Night Is Flying" ("Wachet auf, ruft uns die Stimme", Philipp Nicolai, 1599); "How Brightly Beams the Morning Star!" ("Wie schön leuchtet der Morgenstern", Nicolai, 1597); and the Christmas hymn "A Spotless Rose" ("Es ist ein Ros entsprungen", anon, 1599). She translated Gerhardt's "Die güldne Sonne voll Freud und Wonne" into "The golden sunbeams with their joyous gleams".

Women's education
Winkworth was also involved deeply in promoting women's education, as the secretary of the Clifton Association for Higher Education for Women, and a supporter of the Clifton High School for Girls, where a school house is named after her, and a member of Cheltenham Ladies' College. She was likewise governor of the Red Maids' School in Westbury-on-Trym in the city of Bristol.

Winkworth translated biographies of two founders of sisterhoods for the poor and the sick: Life of Pastor Fliedner, 1861, and Life of Amelia Sieveking, 1863.

Winkworth has been described as "an early feminist".

Peccavi

According to the Encyclopedia of Britain by Bamber Gascoigne (1993), it was Catherine Winkworth who, learning of General Charles James Napier's ruthless and unauthorised, but successful campaign to conquer the Indian province of Sindh, "remarked to her teacher that Napier's despatch to the governor-general of India, after capturing Sindh, should have been Peccavi" (Latin for "I have sinned": a pun on "I have Sindh"). She sent her joke to the new humorous magazine Punch, which printed it on 18 May 1844. She was then sixteen years old.

The Oxford Dictionary of Quotations attributes this to Winkworth, noting that it was assigned to her in Notes and Queries in May 1954.

The pun has usually been credited to Napier himself. The rumour's persistence over the decades led to investigations in Calcutta archives, as well as comments by William Lee-Warner in 1917 and Lord Zetland, Secretary of State for India, in 1936.

Death
Catherine Winkworth died suddenly of heart disease near Geneva on 1 July 1878 and was buried in Monnetier, in Upper Savoy. A monument to her memory was erected in Bristol Cathedral. She is commemorated on the Calendar of Saints of the Evangelical Lutheran Church in America on 1 July.

Hymn books
 Lyra Germanica, Hymns for the Sundays and chief festivals of the Christian Year, Translated from the German, 1855 edition compiled by Catherine Winkworth 
 The Chorale Book for England: A Complete Hymn-book for Public and Private Worship, Catherine Winkworth, William Sterndale Bennett and Otto Goldschmidt (1863)
 Lyra Germanica: the Christian life, Catherine Winkworth (1868)
 Christian Singers of Germany, Catherine Winkworth (1869)
 Songs for the household: Sacred poetry, Catherine Winkworth (1882)

See also

References

Further reading
 The Church Hymn Book (ed. Edwin F. Hatfield. New York and Chicago: 1872)

External links

 Collection of hymns translated by Winkworth (The Cyber Hymnal)
 Biographies and published works (Christian Classics Ethereal Library)

1827 births
1878 deaths
19th-century Anglicans
19th-century British women writers
19th-century British writers
19th-century Christian saints
19th-century British translators
19th-century British women musicians
Anglican saints
Anglican writers
Burials in Auvergne-Rhône-Alpes
Christian female saints of the Late Modern era
Church of England hymnwriters
English Anglicans
English translators
First-wave feminism
German–English translators
People celebrated in the Lutheran liturgical calendar
People from Holborn
Women and education
British women hymnwriters
Writers from London